Mohammad Habib Hasan is a Bangladesh Awami League politician and a Jatiya Sangsad member representing the Dhaka-18 constituency.

Career 
Mohammad Habib Hasan was the General Secretary of greater Uttara thana Awami League. Mohammad Habib Hasan became the Joint General Secretary of Dhaka city north Awami League for the first time on 2016 and again became senior joint general secretary of Dhaka city north Awami League on November 2020. After the death of the former MP of Dhaka-18 Sahara Khatun on 9 July 2020 Mohammad Habib Hasan was elected a Member of Parliament in the vacant seat of Dhaka-18 constituency, in the by-election held on 12 Nov 2020.

References 

4. https://albd-dcn.org/committee/city
https://en.prothomalo.com/bangladesh/politics/habib-hasan-sworn-in-a-mp

Dhaka-18
Living people
Awami League politicians
11th Jatiya Sangsad members
Place of birth missing (living people)
1963 births